Paenarthrobacter nitroguajacolicus is a bacterium species from the genus Paenarthrobacter which has been isolated from soil in the Czech Republic. Paenarthrobacter nitroguajacolicus has the ability to degrade 4-nitroguaiacol.

References

Further reading

External links
Type strain of Arthrobacter nitroguajacolicus at BacDive -  the Bacterial Diversity Metadatabase

Bacteria described in 2004
Micrococcaceae